Tokyo Dawn Records is an independent record label based in Frankfurt am Main, Germany. It began in the demoscene of 1997 as one of the first netlabels to promote "opensource music". It relaunched in 2009 with a new concept.

Tokyo Dawn Records is headed by Marc Wallowy and Fabien Schivre and publishes broken beat, neo soul, funk, house, electro, hip hop and other genres. It runs eclectic compilation series called "The Boogie", "The Heart" and "The Move".

In 2012, a subsidiary called Tokyo Dawn Labs won an award for two digital audio processors.

Artists

Releases 

 Various - Practice Avoiding Mistakes - Compilation - 2003
 Comfort Fit - Forget And Remember - Album - 2005
 Various - Margin London - Compilation - 2005
 Comfort Fit - Polyshufflez - Album - 2009
 Portformat - The Repeat Factor - Album - 2009
 Comfort Fit - Polyshufflez Remixes - Album - 2009
 Portformat - The Repeat Factor Remixes - Album - 2010
 Swede:art - Emotional Colors - Album - 2010
 Various - The Heart - Compilation - 2010
 Swede:art - Emotional Colors Remixes - Album - 2010
 Opolopo - Voltage Controlled Feelings - Album - 2010
 Various - The Boogie - Compilation - 2011
 Amalia - Art Slave - Album - 2011
 Soulparlor - Evoluzion - Album - 2011
 Various - The Heart Volume 2 - Compilation - 2011
 Colonel Red - Keep Walkin - Album - 2011
 Vindahl - Serendipity - Album - 2011
 Various - The Boogie Volume 2 - Compilation - 2011
 Opolopo - Mutants - Album - 2011
 Stan Smith - The Get Up Movement - Album - 2012
 Blaktroniks - Ready Set Blow - Album - 2012
 Portformat - Entropy - Album - 2012
 Various - The Move - Compilation - 2012
 Various - The Boogie Volume 3 - Compilation - 2012
 Positive Flow - Flow Lines - Album - 2012
 Amalia - Makings Of - Album - 2013
 Various - The Heart Volume 3 - 2013
 Personal Life - Morning Light - 2013
 Reggie B - DNA - 2013
 Pugs Atomz – Bama Pi - 2013
 Various - The Boogie Volume 4 - Compilation - 2014
 Opoplopo - "Mutants Volume 2" - 2014
 SoulParlor - "Smile" - 2015
 Positive Flow - "Reflowed" - 2015
 Still Weavens - "Amisana" - 2016
 Various - "The Boogie Volume 5" - Compilation - 2016
 Eneeks - "My Queen, My King, My God"- 2017
 Colonel Red - "Wireless Soldier" - 2017
 Various - "The Move Volume 2" - Compilation - 2017
 Mowgan - "No Time For You" - 2017
 AfriCali - "Taught Of A Culture" - 2017
 Various - "The Heart Volume 4" - Compilation - 2017
 Various - "The Boogie Volume 6" - Compilation - 2017
 LyricL - "Unequivocal" - 2018
 Colonel Red - "Rhyme Travelling" - 2018
 Sool - "Quite Obvious" - 2018
 Pho Que - "Sweet" - 2018
 The Grey Area - "The Grey Area " - 2018

See also 
 List of record labels

References

External links 
 Official site
 Tokyo Dawn Records at Discogs

Electronic dance music record labels
Electronic music record labels
Demogroups
Online music stores of Germany
German independent record labels
Hip hop record labels
House music record labels
Indie rock record labels
Netlabels
Record labels established in 1997